Metus Mortis is the fourth album by the German power metal band Brainstorm, released in 2001.

Track listing 
All songs written & arranged by Brainstorm, all lyrics by Andy B. Franck, except where indicated

 "Metus Mortis" – 1:06  
 "Blind Suffering" – 4:24  
 "Shadowland" – 3:51 
 "Checkmate in Red" – 4:29  
 "Hollow Hideaway" – 4:25  
 "Weakness Sows Its Seed" – 5:45  
 "Into the Never" – 4:23  
 "Under Lights" – 6:05  
 "Cycles" – 4:17 
 "Behind" – 4:26  
 "Meet Me In The Dark" – 3:11
 "Strength of Will" – 3:43
 "Face Down" - 4:15 - (12. track on digipack version, Japanese bonus version)
 "(E.O.C.) Cross God’s Face" - (Japanese bonus version)
 "Savage" (Helloween cover) - (Japanese bonus version)

On the digipack version there is an untitled hidden track after "Strength of Will".
That song is a Vicious Rumors cover:  "Don't Wait For Me".

Personnel
Band members
Andy B. Franck - lead and backing vocals
Torsten Ihlenfeld - guitars, backing vocals, engineer
Milan Loncaric - guitars
Andreas Mailänder - bass
Dieter Bernert - drums

Additional musicians
Michael 'Miro' Rodenberg - keyboards, engineer

Production
Achim Köhler - producer, engineer, mixing, mastering
Elmo - narrator, meth cook for band

References

2001 albums
Brainstorm (German band) albums
Metal Blade Records albums